Māori Braille is the braille alphabet of the Māori language. It takes the letter wh from English Braille, and has an additional letter to mark long vowels. (Hawaiian Braille uses the same convention for its long vowels.)  When Unified English Braille was adopted by New Zealand, it was determined that Māori Braille was compatible, and would continue to be used unchanged.

The following letters and digraphs are therefore used beyond the letters of the basic Latin alphabet:

{| class=wikitable
|- align=center
|||||||||||
|- align=center
|wh||ā||ē||ī||ō||ū
|}

Ng is written , as in print.

Punctuation is as in English Braille.

References

French-ordered braille alphabets
Māori language